Say I Love You, is a 2014 Taiwanese romance comedy television series starring Mike He, Ko Chia-yen and Ella Wilkins. The series is about a single father who rediscovers love and a new career. Filming began on March 13, 2014 and finished filming on June 15, 2014. It began airing on channel CTV on June 15, 2014 every Sunday night at 10:00 PM with episodes re-broadcasting on cable channel CTiTV every following Saturday night at 10:00 PM. It finished airing on September 28, 2013 with 16 episodes total.

Cast

Main cast
Mike He as Shi Pei Ran 
Ko Chia-yen as Chen Yi Jun 
Ella Wilkins as Shi Liang Yu

Extended cast
Lin Mei-hsiu as Chen Yue Xia 
Michael Huang as Qiang Ge 
Zhang Jing Lan as Guo Qiao Fei 
Hongshi as Wang Xiao Wei
Jet Chao as Wang Wei Ren 
Pang Yong Zhi as Jin Jin Yong 
Li Chen Xiang as Ni Yu Chen 
Gina Lin as Ni Yu Heng 
Xie Fei as Wang Bai Han

Cameo
Patrick Lee as Shi Da Wei, Yi Jun's ex-boss (ep 1)
Yang Qi as Qiao Fei's step-mother

Soundtrack
Forever Forever (永遠永遠) by James Morris-Cotterill
Similar Happy (類似快樂) by Where Chou
Different When With You (好好) by Popu Lady
Honey (蜜糖) by Popu Lady
Just Say It by Popu Lady
Lost and Found (迷路) by Selina Jen
Splashing Song (潑水歌) by Mike He & Ella Wilkins

Broadcast

References

External links
CTV Official website 
CTiTV Official website 

China Television original programming
2014 Taiwanese television series debuts
2014 Taiwanese television series endings
Chung T'ien Television original programming
Television series by Chorokbaem Media
Taiwanese romance television series